Wow! Productions is a professional theatre co-operative based in Dunedin, New Zealand. They produce theatre in non-theatre spaces, described by one reviewer as "weird and wonderful venues".  

The co-operative began in 1996 and is run by a charitable trust, whose membership is Martyn Roberts, Cindy Diver, Alison Finigan, Hilary Halba, Lisa Warrington, Donna Agnew, Peter Chin, Courtney Drummond, and Liesel Mitchell. Productions have been mounted in pubs, clubs, art galleries, community halls, an accountancy office, a hairdressing salon, a cathedral crypt and a railway station, where the production included use of a real train.

Their 2020 production of New Zealand theatre classic The End of the Golden Weather was described as a "gift to the community".

Production history

References

External links 
Facebook page

Theatre companies in New Zealand
Culture in Dunedin